Peter Rowe (March 10, 1807 – April 17, 1876) was an American businessman and politician who served one term as a United States Representative from New York from 1853 to 1855.

Biography 
Born in Crescent, New York, Rowe completed preparatory studies and graduated from Schenectady Academy in Schenectady, New York. He engaged in mercantile pursuits and became the chief auditor of the New York Central Railroad. He served as mayor of Schenectady from 1846 to 1850.

Congress 
Rowe was elected as a Democrat to the Thirty-third Congress (March 4, 1853 – March 3, 1855).

Death and burial 
He died in Schenectady on April 17, 1876, and was interred there in Vale Cemetery.

Sources

1807 births
1876 deaths
Mayors of Schenectady, New York
Democratic Party members of the United States House of Representatives from New York (state)
Burials in New York (state)
19th-century American politicians